Tornado intensity is the measure of wind speeds and potential risk produced by a tornado. Intensity can be measured by in situ or remote sensing measurements, but since these are impractical for wide-scale use, intensity is usually inferred by proxies, such as damage. The Fujita scale, Enhanced Fujita scale, and the International Fujita scale rate tornadoes by the damage caused. In contrast to other major storms such as hurricanes and typhoons, such classifications are only assigned retroactively. Wind speed alone is not enough to determine the intensity of a tornado. An EF0 tornado may damage trees and peel some shingles off roofs, while an EF5 tornado can rip well-anchored homes off their foundations, leaving them bare; even deforming large skyscrapers. The similar TORRO scale ranges from a T0 for extremely weak tornadoes to T11 for the most powerful known tornadoes. Doppler radar data, photogrammetry, and ground swirl patterns (cycloidal marks) may also be analyzed to determine the intensity and assign a rating.

Tornadoes vary in intensity regardless of shape, size, and location, though strong tornadoes are typically larger than weak tornadoes. The association with track length and duration also varies, although longer-track (and longer-lived) tornadoes tend to be stronger. In the case of violent tornadoes, only a small portion of the path area is of violent intensity; most of the higher intensity is from subvortices. In the United States, 80% of tornadoes are rated EF0 or EF1 (equivalent to T0 through T3). The rate of occurrence drops off quickly with increasing strength; less than 1% are rated as violent (EF4 or EF5, equivalent to T8 through T11).

History of tornado intensity measurements 

For many years, before the advent of Doppler radar, scientists relied on educated guesses for tornado wind speed. The only evidence indicating wind speeds found in the tornado was the damage left behind by tornadoes that struck populated areas. Some believed they reach ; others thought they might exceed , and perhaps even be supersonic. One can still find these incorrect guesses in some old (until the 1960s) literature, such as the original Fujita intensity scale developed by Dr. Tetsuya Theodore "Ted" Fujita in the early 1970s. However, one can find accounts (e.g. ; be sure to scroll down) of some remarkable work done in this field by a U.S. Army soldier, Sergeant John Park Finley.

In 1971, Dr. Fujita introduced the idea of a scale to measure tornado winds. With the help of colleague Allen Pearson, he created and introduced what came to be called the Fujita scale in 1973. The F in F1, F2, etc. stands for Fujita. The scale was based on a relationship between the Beaufort scale and the Mach number scale; the low end of F1 on his scale corresponds to the low end of B12 on the Beaufort scale, and the low end of F12 corresponds to the speed of sound at sea level, or Mach 1. In practice, tornadoes are only assigned categories F0 through F5.

The TORRO scale, created by the Tornado and Storm Research Organization (TORRO), was developed in 1974 and published a year later. The TORRO scale has 12 levels, which cover a broader range with tighter graduations. It ranges from a T0 for extremely weak tornadoes to T11 for the most powerful known tornadoes. T0–T1 roughly corresponds to F0, T2–T3 to F1, and so on. While T10–T11 would be roughly equivalent to F5, the highest tornado rated to date on the TORRO scale was a T8. Some debate exists as to the usefulness of the TORRO scale over the Fujita scale—while it may be helpful for statistical purposes to have more levels of tornado strength, often the damage caused could be created by a large range of winds, rendering it hard to narrow the tornado down to a single TORRO scale category.

Research conducted in the late 1980s and 1990s suggested that even with the implication of the Fujita scale, tornado winds were notoriously overestimated, especially in significant and violent tornadoes. Because of this, in 2006, the American Meteorological Society introduced the Enhanced Fujita scale, to help assign realistic wind speeds to tornado damage. The scientists specifically designed the scale so that a tornado assessed on the Fujita scale and the Enhanced Fujita scale would receive the same ranking. The EF-scale is more specific in detailing the degrees of damage on different types of structures for a given wind speed. While the F-scale goes from F0 to F12 in theory, the EF-scale is capped at EF5, which is defined as "winds ≥". In the United States, the Enhanced Fujita scale went into effect on February 2, 2007, for tornado damage assessments and the Fujita scale is no longer used.

The first observation confirming that F5 winds could occur happened on April 26, 1991. A tornado near Red Rock, Oklahoma, was monitored by scientists using a portable Doppler radar, an experimental radar device that measures wind speed. Though the portable radar had the uncertainty of ±, this reading was probably within the F5 range, confirming that tornadoes were capable of violent winds found nowhere else on earth.

Eight years later, during the 1999 Oklahoma tornado outbreak of May 3, another scientific team was monitoring an exceptionally violent tornado (one which eventually killed 36 people in the Oklahoma City metropolitan area). In rating tornadoes, only surface wind speeds or the wind speeds indicated by the damage resulting from the tornado, are taken into account. Also, in practice, the F6 rating is not used.

While scientists have long theorized that extremely low pressures might occur in the center of tornadoes, no measurements confirm it. Still, tornadoes are widely varied, so meteorologists are still researching to determine if these values are typical or not.

In 2018, the International Fujita scale was created by the European Severe Storms Laboratory as well as other various European meteorological agencies. Unlike the other three scales (Fujita, Enhanced Fujita, and TORRO), the International Fujita scale has overlapping wind speeds within the ratings. The highest tornado rated on the IF scale was the 2021 South Moravia tornado, which was rated an IF4.

Typical intensity 

In the U.S., F0 and F1 (T0 through T3) tornadoes account for 80 percent of all tornadoes. The rate of occurrence drops off quickly with increasing strengthviolent tornadoes (stronger than F4, T8), account for less than one percent of all tornado reports. Worldwide, strong tornadoes account for an even smaller percentage of total tornadoes. Violent tornadoes are extremely rare outside of the United States and Canada.

F5 and EF5 tornadoes are rare. In the United States, they typically only occur once every few years, and account for approximately 0.1 percent of confirmed tornadoes. An F5 tornado was reported in Elie, Manitoba, in Canada, on June 22, 2007. Before that, the last confirmed F5 was the 1999 Bridge Creek–Moore tornado, which killed 36 people on May 3, 1999. Nine EF5 tornadoes have occurred in the United States, in Greensburg, Kansas, on May 4, 2007; Parkersburg, Iowa, on May 25, 2008; Smithville, Mississippi, Philadelphia, Mississippi, Hackleburg, Alabama, and Rainsville, Alabama, (four separate tornadoes) on April 27, 2011; Joplin, Missouri, on May 22, 2011, and El Reno, Oklahoma, on May 24, 2011. On May 20, 2013, a confirmed EF5 tornado again struck Moore, Oklahoma.

Typical damage 

However, tornado behavior is variable; these figures represent statistical probabilities only.

Two tornadoes that look almost the same can produce drastically different effects. Also, two tornadoes that look very different can produce similar damage, because tornadoes form by several different mechanisms and also follow a lifecycle that causes the same tornado to change in appearance over time. People in the path of a tornado should never attempt to determine its strength as it approaches. Between 1950 and 2014 in the United States, 222 people have been killed by EF1 tornadoes, and 21 have been killed by EF0 tornadoes.

Weak tornadoes 

Around 6070 percent  of tornadoes are designated EF1 or EF0, also known as "weak" tornadoes. But "weak" is a relative term for tornadoes, as even these can cause significant damage. In this time, though, they can cause both damage and fatalities.

EF0 (T0–T1) damage is characterized by superficial damage to structures and vegetation. Well-built structures are typically unscathed, though sometimes sustaining broken windows, with minor damage to roofs and chimneys. Billboards and large signs can be knocked down. Trees may have large branches broken off and can be uprooted if they have shallow roots. Any tornado that is confirmed, but causes no damage (i.e., remains in open fields) is normally rated EF0, as well, even if the tornado had winds that would give it a higher rating. Some NWS offices, however, have rated these tornadoes EFU (EF-Unknown) due to the lack of damage.

EF1 (T2–T3) damage has caused significantly more fatalities than those caused by EF0 tornadoes. At this level, damage to mobile homes and other temporary structures becomes significant, and cars and other vehicles can be pushed off the road or flipped. Permanent structures can suffer major damage to their roofs.

Significant tornadoes 

EF2 (T4–T5) tornadoes are the lower end of "significant" yet are stronger than most tropical cyclones (though tropical cyclones affect a much larger area and their winds take place for much longer duration). Well-built structures can suffer serious damage, including roof loss, and the collapse of some exterior walls may occur in poorly built structures. Mobile homes, however, are destroyed. Vehicles can be lifted off the ground, and lighter objects can become small missiles, causing damage outside of the tornado's main path. Wooded areas have a large percentage of their trees snapped or uprooted.

EF3 (T6–T7) damage is a serious risk to life and limb and the point at which a tornado statistically becomes significantly more destructive and deadly. Few parts of affected buildings are left standing; well-built structures lose all outer and some inner walls. Unanchored homes are swept away, and homes with poor anchoring may collapse entirely. Small vehicles and similarly sized objects are lifted off the ground and tossed as projectiles. Wooded areas suffer an almost total loss of vegetation, and some tree debarking may occur. Statistically speaking, EF3 is the maximum level that allows for reasonably effective residential sheltering in place in a first-floor interior room closest to the center of the house (the most widespread tornado sheltering procedure in America for those with no basement or underground storm shelter).

Violent tornadoes 

EF4 (T8–T9) damage typically results in a total loss of the affected structure. Well-built homes are reduced to a short pile of medium-sized debris on the foundation. Homes with poor or no anchoring are swept completely away. Large, heavy vehicles, including airplanes, trains, and large trucks, can be pushed over, flipped repeatedly, or picked up and thrown. Large, healthy trees are entirely debarked and snapped off close to the ground or uprooted altogether and turned into flying projectiles. Passenger cars and similarly sized objects can be picked up and flung for considerable distances. EF4 damage can be expected to level even the most robustly built homes, making the common practice of sheltering in an interior room on the ground floor of a residence insufficient to ensure survival. A storm shelter, reinforced basement, or other subterranean shelter is considered necessary to provide any reasonable expectation of safety against EF4 damage.

EF5 (T10–T11) damage represents the upper limit of tornado power, and destruction is almost always total. An EF5 tornado pulls well-built, well-anchored homes off their foundations and into the air before obliterating them, flinging the wreckage for miles, and sweeping the foundation clean. Large, steel-reinforced structures such as schools are completely leveled. Tornadoes of this intensity tend to shred and scour low-lying grass and vegetation from the ground. Very little recognizable structural debris is generated by EF5 damage, with most materials reduced to a coarse mix of small, granular particles and dispersed evenly across the tornado's damage path. Large, multiple-ton steel frame vehicles and farm equipment are often mangled beyond recognition and deposited miles away or reduced entirely to unrecognizable parts. The official description of this damage highlights the extreme nature of the destruction, noting that "incredible phenomena will occur"; historically, this has included such displays of power as twisting skyscrapers, leveling entire communities, and stripping asphalt from roadbeds. Despite their relative rarity, the damage caused by EF5 tornadoes represents a disproportionate hazard to life and limb; since 1950 in the United States, only 59 tornadoes (0.1% of all reports) have been designated F5 or EF5, and yet these have been responsible for more than 1300 deaths and 14,000 injuries (21.5 and 13.6%, respectively).

See also 

 
 Tornado
 List of F5 and EF5 tornadoes
 Tornado records
 Wind engineering

References

Further reading 
 

Tornado
Tornadogenesis